"Undertow" is a song by the American indie rock band Warpaint. It is the third track and lead single from the band's debut studio album The Fool, and was released on September 21, 2010 on Rough Trade Records. Described by the band as an homage to the Nirvana song "Polly", "Undertow" received favorable acclaim and placed in the United Kingdom's Independent Singles and Independent Breakers charts upon its release. A limited edition double A-side single was released as part of the Record Store Day 2012.

Describing the origins of the song, bassist Jenny Lee Lindberg said "Undertow" developed from a bassline she and guitarist Theresa Wayman were working on. According to Lindberg, "[Wayman] just started singing the lyrics to 'Polly' over that song … instead of making that a cover … we said, 'well, write your own words to the song'." Lindberg added that if "you listen to the songs back-to-back they sound nothing alike" but referred to "Undertow" as "a bit of an homage to Kurt [Cobain]  and Nirvana." A music video for "Undertow" was directed by Lindberg's sister and former Warpaint drummer Shannyn Sossamon.

Track listing
All songs written and composed by Warpaint.

Digital download
"Undertow"– 5:53

Record Store Day 7"
"Undertow"– 5:53
"Warpaint"– 5:54

Personnel
All personnel credits adapted from The Fools album notes.

Warpaint
Emily Kokal – vocals, guitar
Theresa Wayman – vocals, guitar
Jenny Lee Lindberg – bass, backing vocals
Stella Mozgawa – drums, keyboards

Technical personnel
Tom Bille – production, recording
Nina Walsh –engineering
Sonny DiPerri – assistant engineering
Andrew Weatherall – mixing

Chart positions

References

External links
 at VH1

2010 songs
2010 debut singles
Rough Trade Records singles
Warpaint (band) songs
Songs written by Emily Kokal
Songs written by Jenny Lee Lindberg
Songs written by Theresa Wayman
Songs written by Stella Mozgawa
2010 singles